Mosaic MSC  is a contemporary worship music band from Mosaic Church in Los Angeles, California. The band is led by Worship Pastor Mariah McManus. The band have released three live albums and three extended plays.

History
Mosaic MSC recorded its first worship album, MSC (Live from LA) on May 24, 2014 at the historic Wiltern Theater. After it was released in 2015, it peaked at number 21 on the Christian Albums chart. Mosaic MSC has several charting singles. The song "Nvr Stp" peaked at number 49 on the Billboard Hot Christian Songs in 2015 and their song "Tremble" peaked at number 19 on the chart in March 2018.

Their second album Glory & Wonder peaked at number 16 in 2016.

Discography

Studio albums

Live albums

Extended plays

Singles

Awards

GMA Dove Awards

|-
|rowspan="3"| 2018
| "Tremble"
| Worship Song of the Year
| 
|-
| Mosaic MSC
| New Artist of the Year
| 
|-
| "Tremble"
| Worship Recorded Song of the Year
| 
|-
| 2022
| "Mi Salvador"
| Spanish Language Recorded Song of the Year
| 
|-

References

External links
 

Musical groups established in 2014
Musical groups from California
Performers of contemporary worship music
Performers of contemporary Christian music
2014 establishments in California